The 20th FIL World Luge Natural Track Championships 2015 took place 15–18 January in St. Sebastian, Austria.

Men's singles

Women's singles

Men's doubles

Notes and references

FIL 2014-15 Natural Track World Cup Schedule. 

FIL World Luge Natural Track Championships
2015 in Italian sport
2015 in luge
Luge in Austria